Egan Inoue (born June 4, 1965) is a Brazilian jiu-jitsu practitioner, former mixed martial artist and racquetball competitor.  A two-time International Racquetball Federation (IRF) World Champion, Inoue is a two-time Brazilian jiu-jitsu world champion in colored belts, the first non-Brazilian to win a gold medal at the World Jiu Jitsu Championship.

Early life 
Egan Inoue was born on 4 June 1965, in Honolulu, Hawaii, in a family of Japanese descent. He started practicing Shotokan Karate from a young age taught by his grandfather. He would later take up Wing Chun Kung Fu, Taekwondo, Judo, Hapkido, and Jujutsu. At 16 he started practicing racquetball becoming state champion by the time he turned 18.

Racquetball career 
Inoue played professional racquetball on the International Racquetball Tour, winning two tournaments, and finishing in the top 10 ranked players four times: 1986–87 to 1988–89 and 1990–91. His record on the IRT is 84–63. Inoue briefly ascended to be the No. 1 ranked player on tour in December 1990 before finishing the season ranked 6th. But Inoue's racquetball career is highlighted by two World Championships. His first came in 1986 in Orlando, Florida, when he defeated Canadian Roger Harripersad in the final, 15–2, 7–15, and 15–7. Four years later, in 1990, Inoue defeated fellow American Tim Doyle in the final, 13–15, 15–13, 15–5, to win his second World Championship. In 1989, Inoue had a 50 percent ownership in E-Force, a racquetball equipment company. In 1993, he sold his stake in E-Force and returned to jiu jitsu.

Brazilian jiu-jitsu career 
Inoue started training Brazilian jiu-jitsu (BJJ) in the late 1980s at Relson Gracie's academy in the late 1980s before joining the Machado academy where he earned his purple and brown belts. In 1996, Inoue won the World Brazilian Jiu-Jitsu Championship in the blue belt division. He was the first American to win the title. He then returned to Brazil in 1997 and won the World Brazilian Jiu-Jitsu Championship in the absolute purple belt division. Inoue later joined John Lewis academy where he was promoted to black belt. Inoue holds a 4th degree black belt in Jiu Jitsu.

Mixed martial arts career 
Inoue went on to fight professionally in MMA. He retired in 2003 but came out of retirement on May 5, 2008, beating Hans Marrero by TKO at a X-1 – Legends, an MMA show held at the Neil S. Blaisdell Center in Honolulu, Hawaii.

Inoue's MMA record is 13 wins with 8 losses. He has opened up three MMA training schools in the state of Hawaii. Inoue's MMA career led him to fights in Pride, Shooto, Superbrawl and Luminex Cup.  He enjoyed a successful career with five world championship titles.

His younger brother Enson Inoue went on to become the first ever Heavyweight Champion of Shooto.

Instructor lineage 
Kano Jigoro → Mitsuyo "Count Koma" Maeda → Carlos Gracie → Helio Gracie → Carlson Gracie → André Pederneiras > John Lewis > Egan Inoue

Championships and accomplishments 
BJJ and Grappling achievements:
 IBJJF World Champion (1996 blue, 1997 purple)
 3rd place World Masters Championship (2014)
 4th place ADCC World Championship (1999/2001)

Wrestling:
 Icon Sport Middleweight Championship (1 Time, First)
 Lumax Cup Tournament of 'J 95 Runner-up

Mixed martial arts record 

|-
| Win
| align=center| 13-8
| Hans Marrero
| TKO (retirement)
| X-1 – Legends
| 
| align=center| 3
| align=center| 5:00
| Honolulu, Hawaii, United States
|
|-
| Loss
| align=center| 12-8
| Jason Miller
| TKO (corner stoppage)
| SB 32 – SuperBrawl 32
| 
| align=center| 2
| align=center| 5:00
| Honolulu, Hawaii, United States
|
|-
| Loss
| align=center| 12-7
| Masanori Suda
| KO (punches)
| SB 29 – SuperBrawl 29
| 
| align=center| 1
| align=center| 0:27
| Honolulu, Hawaii, United States
| For Shooto Middleweight Championship. Lost Icon Spot Middleweight Championship.
|-
| Win
| align=center| 12-6
| Yukiya Naito
| Decision (unanimous)
| SB 28 – SuperBrawl 28
| 
| align=center| 2
| align=center| 5:00
| Honolulu, Hawaii, United States
|
|-
| Win
| align=center| 11-6
| Martijn de Jong
| KO (kick)
| SB 25 – SuperBrawl 25
| 
| align=center| 1
| align=center| 2:46
| Honolulu, Hawaii, United States
|
|-
| Win
| align=center| 10-6
| Marcos da Silva
| Submission (punches)
| SB 23 – SuperBrawl 23
| 
| align=center| 2
| align=center| 0:56
| Honolulu, Hawaii, United States
|
|-
| Win
| align=center| 9-6
| Joe Doerksen
| Submission (toe hold)
| SB 22 – SuperBrawl 22
| 
| align=center| 1
| align=center| 0:56
| Honolulu, Hawaii, United States
|
|-
| Win
| align=center| 8-6
| Brett Al-azzawi
| Submission (forearm choke)
| SB 21 – SuperBrawl 21
| 
| align=center| 1
| align=center| 1:29
| Honolulu, Hawaii, United States
|
|-
| Loss
| align=center| 7-6
| Guy Mezger
| KO (punch)
| Pride 13 – Collision Course
| 
| align=center| 1
| align=center| 2:25
| Saitama, Japan
|
|-
| Win
| align=center| 7-5
| John Alessio
| Submission (rear-naked choke)
| SB 15 – SuperBrawl 15
| 
| align=center| 1
| align=center| 2:41
| Honolulu, Hawaii, United States
|
|-
| Loss
| align=center| 6-5
| Carl Ognibene
| Decision (unanimous)
| Pride 6
| 
| align=center| 3
| align=center| 5:00
| Yokohama, Kanagawa, Japan
|
|-
| Win
| align=center| 6-4
| Marcelo Tigre
| DQ (excessive fouling)
| SB 12 – SuperBrawl 12
| 
| align=center| 2
| align=center| 0:12
| Honolulu, Hawaii, United States
| Won Icon Sport Middleweight Championship
|-
| Win
| align=center| 5-4
| Minoru Toyonaga
| TKO (punches)
| Pride 5
| 
| align=center| 1
| align=center| 5:53
| Nagoya, Aichi, Japan
|
|-
| Loss
| align=center| 4-4
| Mauricio Silva
| Decision
| WSKF – World Challenge
| 
| align=center| 3
| align=center| 5:00
| Waikiki, Hawaii, United States
|
|-
| Loss
| align=center| 4-3
| Masayuki Naruse
| DQ
| Rings – Maelstrom 6
| 
| align=center| 1
| align=center| 11:51
| Japan
|
|-
| Loss
| align=center| 4-2
| Sanae Kikuta
| Decision
| Lumax Cup – Tournament of J '96
| 
| align=center| 1
| align=center| 5:00
| Japan
| Tournament quarter-finals
|-
| Win
| align=center| 4-1
| Yasunobu Matsuo
| Submission (armlock)
| Lumax Cup – Tournament of J '96
| 
| align=center| 1
| align=center| 1:20
| Japan
| Tournament qualifier
|-
| Win
| align=center| 3-1
| Gordon Dehdman
| Submission (triangle choke)
| Shooto – Vale Tudo Junction 2
| 
| align=center| 1
| align=center| 1:39
| Tokyo, Japan
|
|-
| Loss
| align=center| 2-1
| Tsuyoshi Kohsaka
| Decision (unanimous)
| Lumax Cup – Tournament of J '95
| 
| align=center| 3
| align=center| 3:00
| Japan
| Tournament finals
|-
| Win
| align=center| 2-0
| Akihiro Gono
| Submission (armbar)
| Lumax Cup – Tournament of J '95
| 
| align=center| 1
| align=center| 1:33
| Japan
| Tournament semi-finals
|-
| Win
| align=center| 1–0
| Alexander Otsuka
| Submission (armbar)
| Lumax Cup – Tournament of J '95
| 
| align=center| 1
| align=center| 0:55
| Japan
| Tournament quarter-finals

Submission grappling record 
KO PUNCHES
|- style="text-align:center; background:#f0f0f0;"
| style="border-style:none none solid solid; "|Result
| style="border-style:none none solid solid; "|Opponent
| style="border-style:none none solid solid; "|Method
| style="border-style:none none solid solid; "|Event
| style="border-style:none none solid solid; "|Date
| style="border-style:none none solid solid; "|Round
| style="border-style:none none solid solid; "|Time
| style="border-style:none none solid solid; "|Notes
|-
|Loss|| Nino Schembri || Points || ADCC 2001 –88 kg 3rd place|| 2001|| 1|| 10:00||
|-
|Loss|| Sanae Kikuta || Points || ADCC 2001 –88 kg|| 2001|| 1|| 10:00||
|-
|Win|| Ricardo Liborio || Points || ADCC 2001 –88 kg|| 2001|| 1|| 15:00||
|-
|Win|| Vladimir Zharkov || Submission (rear naked choke) || ADCC 2001 –88 kg|| 2001|| 1|| 9:30||
|-
|Win|| Emil Khachatryan || Points || ADCC 2000 –88 kg|| 2000|| 1|| 10||
|-
|Loss|| Ricardo Liborio || Points || ADCC 1999 –88 kg 3rd place|| 1999|| 1|| 10||
|-
|Loss|| Karim Barkalaev || Points || ADCC 1999 –88 kg|| 1999|| 1|| 10||
|-
|Win|| Renzo Gracie || Points || ADCC 1999 –88 kg|| 1999|| 1|| 10||
|-
|Win|| Robbie Kilpatrick || Submission (armbar) || ADCC 1999 –88 kg|| 1999|| 1|| 9:25||
|-

Notes

See also 
 List of male mixed martial artists
 List of racquetball players

References

External links 
 
 Official website
 Egan Inoue making a return

1965 births
Living people
Sportspeople from Honolulu
American racquetball players
American male mixed martial artists
Mixed martial artists from Hawaii
Middleweight mixed martial artists
Light heavyweight mixed martial artists
Mixed martial artists utilizing boxing
Mixed martial artists utilizing Brazilian jiu-jitsu
American practitioners of Brazilian jiu-jitsu
People awarded a black belt in Brazilian jiu-jitsu
American sportspeople of Japanese descent